In U.S. politics (as well as in some other countries utilizing the presidential system), the majority floor leader is a partisan position in a legislative body.

United States

In the federal Congress of the United States, the roles of the House Majority Leader and the Senate Majority Leader differ slightly. At the state level, the majority leader of a given state legislative chamber usually performs a similar role to that of their federal counterpart.

Senate

In the Senate, the Vice President of the United States is officially the President of the Senate and the President pro tempore serves as the President of the Senate in the absence of the Vice President. However, in reality, the Vice President seldom enters the Senate, let alone directly presides over the chamber, unless a tied vote is expected, and the President pro tempore has become a ceremonial role deprived of any leadership ability.

Thus, the Majority Leader is seen as the de facto leader of the Senate, especially in modern times, and thus, in accordance with Senate rules, the Presiding Officer of the day gives the Majority Leader priority in obtaining recognition to speak on the floor of the Senate and they determine which bills get voted on. The Majority Leader is seen as the chief spokesperson for their party in the Senate.

In the United States Senate, the current Majority Leader is Chuck Schumer, who assumed the office on January 20, 2021.

House of Representatives

In the House of Representatives the Majority Leader's presence and power often depends on the session. In some sessions, the Majority Leader takes precedence over the Speaker as House leader and legislative party leader either by force (which usually occurs when the Speaker of the House is unpopular) or because the Speaker of the House voluntarily surrenders power to the Majority Leader. In most sessions, the Speaker of the House takes precedence as house leader and party leader, with the Majority Leader being irrelevant and largely powerless outside the fact they might be Speaker of the House one day. Except, of course, for the fact that The Majority Leader (as well as the Speaker and the Minority Leader) are the only members of the House that can speak on the floor for an unlimited amount of time and cannot be interrupted by the chair.

In the United States House of Representatives, the current Majority Leader is Steve Scalise, who assumed office on January 3, 2023.

See also
 Floor leader
 Minority leader

References

Leaders of the United States Congress